Valley Grove may refer to:

Valley Grove (Wheeling Township, Minnesota)
Valley Grove, West Virginia

See also
Valley Grove School District